Lowthorpe railway station was a minor railway station serving the village of Lowthorpe on the Yorkshire Coast Line from  to Hull and was opened on 6 October 1846 by the York and North Midland Railway. It closed on 5 January 1970.

References

Disused railway stations in the East Riding of Yorkshire
Railway stations in Great Britain opened in 1846
Railway stations in Great Britain closed in 1970
Stations on the Hull to Scarborough line
1846 establishments in England
Former York and North Midland Railway stations
Beeching closures in England
George Townsend Andrews railway stations